The Statute Law Revision Act 1966 (c 5) was an Act of the Parliament of the United Kingdom.

This Act was repealed by section 1 of, and Part XI of the Schedule to, the Statute Law (Repeals) Act 1974.

The enactments which were repealed (whether for the whole or any part of the United Kingdom) by this Act were repealed so far as they extended to the Isle of Man on 25 July 1991.

Section 2 - Saving for powers of the Parliament of Northern Ireland
This section was repealed by section 41(1) of, and Part I of Schedule 6 to, the Northern Ireland Constitution Act 1973.

See also
Statute Law Revision Act

References
Halsbury's Statutes,
John Burke (General editor). Current Law Statutes Annotated 1966. Sweet & Maxwell, Stevens & Sons. London. W Green & Son. Edinburgh. 1966.
The Public General Acts 1966. HMSO. London. 1966. Page 57.
HL Deb vol 271, cols 402 to 403, HC Deb vol 724, cols 1662 to 1667.

United Kingdom Acts of Parliament 1966